Craig Ross Jr.'s Monogamy is an American television drama series created by Craig Ross Jr. and his wife Caryn Ward Ross. The series follows four married couples and their unconventional form of therapy with the hopes of reviving their failing relationships. It starring ensemble cast includes Jill Marie Jones, Brian J. White, Vanessa Simmons, Darius McCrary, Wesley Jonathan, Caryn Ward Ross, Blue Kimble and Chrystee Pharris. The writing staff includes Tamika Lamison, Cleve Lamison, Kelvin Foster, Shannan E. Johnson, Caryn Ward Ross and Craig Ross Jr.

The first season premiered on the streaming service Urban Movie Channel on May 4, 2018. On March 28, 2019, the series was renewed for the second season. The series was renewed for the third season premiering in 2021. According to UMC, Monogamy is the streamer's most popular program. In 2020, the series premiered on Netflix worldwide outside the United States.

Cast and characters
 Jill Marie Jones as Maggie Baker
 Brian J. White as Dallas
 Vanessa Simmons as Caroline
 Darius McCrary as Connor
 Wesley Jonathan as Carson
 Caryn Ward Ross as Sincere 
 Blue Kimble as Sawyer
 Chrystee Pharris as Diandra

Episodes
</onlyinclude>

Season 1 (2018)

Season 2 (2019)

Season 3 (2021)

References

External links
 

English-language television shows
2018 American television series debuts
2010s American drama television series
Television shows set in Los Angeles
Urban Movie Channel original programming